The Gaza were Nguni people who left what is now South Africa in the early 19th century and settled in Gazaland in what is now Southern Mozambique. An early leader was Soshangane (circa 1828), under whom they migrated somewhat further North to the Save River area.

Ethnic groups in Mozambique